Oxychilidae is a taxonomic family of air-breathing land snails, terrestrial pulmonate gastropod mollusks in the superfamily Gastrodontoidea.

Distribution 
The distribution of Oxychilidae includes the Nearctic, western-Palearctic, eastern-Palearctic, Neotropical, Ethiopia and Hawaii.

Taxonomy 
The following three subfamilies were recognized in the taxonomy of Bouchet & Rocroi (2005):
 Subfamily Oxychilinae Hesse, 1927 (1879) - synonyms: Helicellinae H. Adams & A. Adams, 1855 (inv.); Hyalininae Clessin, 1876 (inv.); Hyaliniinae Strebel & Pfeffer, 1879; Nastiinae A. Riedel, 1989
 Subfamily Daudebardiinae Kobelt, 1906
 Subfamily Godwiniinae Cooke, 1921

Genera 
Genera within the Oxychilidae include:

subfamily Oxychilinae
 Oxychilus Fitzinger, 1833
 subgenus Oxychilus Fitzinger 1833
 subgenus Riedelius Hudec 1961
 Allogenes Gude, 1911
 Araboxychilus A. Riedel, 1977
 Cellariopsis A.J.Wagner, 1914
 Conulopolita O. Boettger, 1879
 Discoxychilus A. Riedel, 1966
 Eopolita Pollonera, 1916
 Gastranodon O. Boettger, 1889
 Iranoxychilus A. Riedel, 1998
 Mediterranea Clessin, 1880 - sometimes as a subgenus of Oxychilus
 Morlina A. J. Wagner 1914 - sometimes as a subgenus of Oxychilus
 Nastia  Riedel, 1989
 Oxychilus Fitzinger, 1833
 Pseudopolita Germain, 1908
 Schistophallus A. J. Wagner, 1914
 Vitrinoxychilus A. Riedel, 1963

subfamily Daudebardiinae
 Carpathica A. J. Wagner, 1895
 Daudebardia Hartmann, 1821 - type genus of the subfamily Daudebardiinae

Cladogram 
The following cladogram shows the phylogenic relationships of this family to the other families within the limacoid clade:

References

External links